File, Ilirjan (born 31 October 1969 in Elbasan) is an Albanian football coach who has been the manager of KF Elbasani twice in the Albanian Superliga.

References

1969 births
Living people
Sportspeople from Elbasan
Albanian footballers
Albanian football managers
KF Elbasani managers
Shkumbini Peqin managers
Kategoria Superiore managers
Association footballers not categorized by position